Shemam (also Romanized as Shemām and Shomām; also known as Shiman) is a village in Rostamabad-e Jonubi Rural District, in the Central District of Rudbar County, Gilan Province, Iran. At the 2006 census, its population was 132 in 45 families.

References 

Populated places in Rudbar County